Louis Dausset (September 3, 1866 – January 22, 1940) was a French politician. He served as a member of the French Senate from 1920 to 1927, representing Seine.

References

1866 births
1940 deaths
People from Tarbes
Collège Stanislas de Paris alumni
French Senators of the Third Republic
Senators of Seine (department)
Officiers of the Légion d'honneur
Members of the Ligue de la patrie française